Cottage is an unincorporated community in Macon County, in the U.S. state of Missouri.

History
Cottage was founded to serve as a post office for the immediate rural area. A post office called Cottage was established in 1891, and remained in operation until 1904.

References

Unincorporated communities in Macon County, Missouri
Unincorporated communities in Missouri